Genie Pace was an American jazz and pop singer of the late 1950s and early 1960s. She and Doris Allen were signed by newly independent New York label Jade Records after its establishment.

Her first album Love in a Midnight Mood album on Jade was followed later the same year by a second album Here's Genie on Bright Records. In 1960 she released the single Just Counting Stars In 1961, she was signed to Capitol Records, and at the height of the Pachanga dance craze in the US, released a version of Eduardo Davidson's archetypical Pachanga tune, La Pachanga. At the same time, other versions appeared by Hugo and Luigi and their children's chorus and in Europe by Audrey Arno.

Recordings
Genie Pace recorded only two albums, Love In A Midnight Mood on the small Jade Records label in 1956, and Here's Genie for the Bright Records label in 1957.  She also recorded an EP in 1961 for Capitol Records called La Pachanga, which at the time was a current dance craze.

Studio albums

Singles

Reactions
Billboard covered several of Pace's recordings. It rated Just Counting Stars as having "Moderate Sales Potential", describing it as "Exotic ballad with Latin beat is chanted with rich sincerity." "La Pachanga" was listed by Billboard as first on its list of "Pick Hits" (songs which its editors predicted would likely become hits) on March 20, 1960.

"I'll Never be Free" and "Rolling the Jack Twist" were also deemed "Moderate Sales Potential".

References

Year of birth missing
Possibly living people
American women jazz singers
American jazz singers
American women pop singers